Bychye is a rural locality (a village) and the administrative center of Bychenskoye Rural Settlement of Mezensky District, Arkhangelsk Oblast, Russia. The population was 131 as of 2010. There are 14  streets.

Geography 
Bychye is located 68 km southeast of Mezen (the district's administrative centre) by road. Ust-Nyafta is the nearest rural locality.

References 

Rural localities in Mezensky District